Anardar-e Pain (also Romanized as Anārdar-e Pā’īn) is a village in Koregah-e Gharbi Rural District, in the Central District of Khorramabad County, Lorestan Province, Iran. At the 2006 census, its population was 15, in 4 families.

References 

Towns and villages in Khorramabad County